Babbage is an ancient lunar impact crater that is located near the northwest limb of the Moon, named after Charles Babbage. It is attached to the southeastern rim of the prominent crater Pythagoras. The crater remnant named South intrudes into the southeastern floor of Babbage.

The outer rim of Babbage has been eroded and modified by a multitude of subsequent impacts, until all that remains is a ring of rounded hills. The most notable of these modifications is the satellite crater Babbage D, which overlays the southwestern rim. The northeast rim of this satellite crater is missing, and it forms a bay on the perimeter of Babbage. Oenopides is another worn formation attached to the southwest edge of this protuberance.

The outer rampart of Pythagoras lies across the floor of Babbage, forming a region of rough terrain in the northwest part of the interior. The remainder of the crater floor is relatively flat, although it is marked by many tiny craterlets. The most notable feature on the floor is the satellite crater Babbage A, which lies in the southeast part of the interior. This feature has not been significantly worn, and appears much younger than the remainder of the formation. Just to the west of Babbage A is the smaller Babbage C, a bowl-shaped formation.

Satellite craters

By convention these features are identified on lunar maps by placing the letter on the side of the crater midpoint that is closest to Babbage.

References

External links
 

Impact craters on the Moon
Charles Babbage

es:Babbage